Rhytisternus is a genus of beetles in the family Carabidae, containing the following species:

 Rhytisternus angustulus Macleay, 1888
 Rhytisternus arnheimensis (Castelnau, 1867)
 Rhytisternus bovilli Blackburn, 1890
 Rhytisternus callabonnensis Sloane, 1895
 Rhytisternus cardwellensis Blackburn, 1892
 Rhytisternus carpentarius Sloane, 1895
 Rhytisternus cyathoderus (Chaudoir, 1865)
 Rhytisternus froggatti (Macleay, 1888)
 Rhytisternus gigas Sloane, 1895
 Rhytisternus laevidorsis (Tschitscherine, 1890)
 Rhytisternus laevilaterus (Chaudoir, 1865)
 Rhytisternus laevis (Macleay, 1883)
 Rhytisternus limbatus Macleay, 1888
 Rhytisternus liopleurus (Chaudoir, 1865)
 Rhytisternus mastersii (Macleay, 1871)
 Rhytisternus miser (Chaudoir, 1865)
 Rhytisternus nigellus Sloane, 1895
 Rhytisternus obtusus Sloane, 1895
 Rhytisternus plebeius (Chaudoir, 1874)
 Rhytisternus puellus (Chaudoir, 1865)
 Rhytisternus solidus Sloane, 1895
 Rhytisternus splendens Blackburn, 1892
 Rhytisternus stuarti Sloane, 1895
 Rhytisternus sulcatipes Blackburn, 1888

References

Pterostichinae